ISLE Theater Company ("ISLE") is a Maine-based organization known for creating original, community-driven theater productions.

History 
Founded in 2020 by Anna Fitzgerald and Marvin Merritt IV under the name ANNA + MARVIN, ISLE Theater Company began on Deer Isle after its two founders graduated from Harvard University and sought to make safe, accessible theater in the midst of the coronavirus pandemic.  Merritt serves as the Artistic & Executive Director, while Fitzgerald serves as the Associate Director. Fitzgerald and Merritt aim to produce two shows annually.  

In their first year, ISLE Theater Company produced two shows: Rajiv Joseph's Gruesome Playground Injuries at Moss Ledge Cottage, an oceanfront cottage overlooking Penobscot Bay, and Anna Fitzgerald's Do Not Move Stones at the Settlement Quarry Preserve, a defunct granite quarry in Stonington, ME where they reached over one thousand people over three evenings.  ISLE received ten BroadwayWorld Maine awards in 2021 including "Best Production of the Year" and "Best Play."

In 2022, ISLE Theater Company announced the world premiere of Anna Fitzgerald's Playing Mercury, a medieval-period comedy inspired by William Shakespeare's As You Like It with outdoor performances at Horsepower Farm in Penobscot in August and released for digital on-demand in September.

External links 

 Official company website

References 
 

Theatre companies in Maine
American companies established in 2021
Deer Isle, Maine